Mathias Richling (born 24 March 1953 in Waiblingen) is a German actor, author, comedian and Kabarett artist.

Richling studied literature, music and theatre. From 1989 to 1996 he had  a program called Jetzt schlägt's Richling on the German TV channel ARD. Since 1999 he produced the program Zwerch trifft Fell on the German TV channel Südwestrundfunk. Together with Bruno Jonas he was part of the popular German cabaret show Scheibenwischer. He often presents in cabaret high-ranked German politicians.

Works by Richling 

 1974 Köpfe u. v. a.
 1976 Riesenblödsinn?
 1977 Ich bin’s gar nicht
 1979 Zuerst mal die Zugaben
 1980 Zu uns gesagt mit Günter Verdin
 1981 Ich habe nie gesagt
 1982 Ich wiederhol’s gerade mal
 1983 Daß Fernseh bled macht?
 1985 Reden Sie! Jetzt red’ich!
 1987 Wieviel Demokratie ist es bitte?
 1989 Was ich noch vergessen wollte...
 1990 Jetzt schlägt’s Richling
 1996 Ich muß noch was beRICHLINGen
 1999 RICHLING- Das @ntWort
 2004 Richling WAAS?!
 2006 E=m·Richling²
 2010 Der Richling-Code

Awards 

 1978: Deutscher Kleinkunstpreis, City Mainz
 1987: Deutscher Kleinkunstpreis
 1988: Österreichischer Kleinkunstpreis
 2000: Schweizer Kabarettpreis (Cornichon)
 2007: Bayerischer Kabarettpreis

Literature about Richling 

 Doris Rosenstein: Fernseh(schwäbisches) Kabarett [: Mathias Richling]. in: Suevica 7 (1993). Stuttgart 1994 [1995], Pages 153-192

External links 
 Official website (in German)
 Literature by and over Mathias Richling in catalog of German National Library

1953 births
Living people
People from Waiblingen
German television personalities
German male comedians
German satirists
German cabaret performers
Kabarettists
ARD (broadcaster) people